Shah Abdul Majid Qureshi,  also known by his daak naam Moina Meah, was an early British Bangladeshi restaurateur and social reformer. He is notable for being involved in the early politics of British Asians and pioneering social welfare work for the working-class diaspora in the United Kingdom. He was the first ever Sylheti to open up a restaurant in the United Kingdom, and his restaurants were one of the earliest Indian restaurants at the time. Another one of his restaurants, India Centre, often provided facilities and was a location where important meetings were held by the India League attracting the likes of Subhas Chandra Bose and V. K. Krishna Menon.

Early life
Qureshi came from a traditional Bengali Muslim family claiming descent from the Arab tribe of Quraysh. He was born in the Patli village of Jagannathpur in the Sylhet District of  the British India's Assam Province on the 25th of September 1915. He was the eldest child and had two brothers and a sister. The family residence in Patli was known as Quresh Bari and his father owned some land. However, his father's main goal was to educate his children which was extremely expensive leading to him sell nearly all his land. This led to Qureshi being well educated during his youth. Qureshi decided to become a lascar after being inspired by many other Sylheti men and moved to Calcutta in 1934. He believed that seafaring was a historical inheritance of Sylhetis due to many Sylhetis being descendants of foreign traders and businessmen. During his stay in the port city, he attempted to jump on ships going to the United States. In 1936, at his early 20s, Qureshi successfully attempted to jump on a ship on its way to New York City. However, he failed but ended up at the Tilbury Docks in Essex.

Career
Qureshi's first job in the United Kingdom consisted of selling chocolates. After getting into contact with other British Asians, he began working in South Asian cuisine restaurants such as Bengal Restaurant in Percy Street. After two years of living in the United Kingdom, Qureshi opened his first restaurant, Dilkush, which was located in Soho's Windmill Street. This was the first restaurant to be opened by a Sylheti person. The restaurant, located near Tottenham Court Road, was destroyed by a bomb in 1940.

In 1943, Qureshi, alongside his acquaintance Ayub Ali Master, founded the Indian Seamen's Welfare League with a purpose of promoting the social welfare of lascars. Based in Christian Street, the organisation ensured the rights of Asians and made it easier for them to communicate to their family abroad. On 14 July 1943, the first meeting took place, in King's Hall, Commercial Street, London. The meeting attracted mostly Bengali Muslims but dozens of Europeans were also present. Later, the organisation was renamed to the Indian Seamen's Welfare League to sound less political and Qureshi was made president of the welfare league.

The following year, Qureshi opened another restaurant off Charlotte Street which came to be known as the India Centre. The India Centre was frequently visited by British Asians, in particular politicians, who held important communal and political meetings there. Qureshi also assisted and attended V. K. Krishna Menon's India League and Surat Alley's Hindustani Social Club meetings. He was also involved with the Indian National Congress and was in contact with the likes of Subhas Chandra Bose. Later on, he became a member of the All-India Muslim League.

In 1946, Qureshi returned to Sylhet, where he married and lived for over two decades before returning to the United Kingdom with his family in the 1970s.

Legacy
His sons continue to own Indian cuisine restaurants in the United Kingdom.

See also
 Aftab Ali
 I'tisam-ud-Din

References

British restaurateurs
1915 births
2003 deaths
British Muslims
Bangladeshi emigrants to England
Bangladeshi people of Arab descent
British chefs
Bangladeshi businesspeople
Businesspeople from London
British chief executives
British company founders
Chefs of Indian cuisine
20th-century British businesspeople
20th-century Muslims
21st-century Muslims
All India Muslim League members
20th-century English businesspeople
People from Patli Union